Buchanan's Wife is a 1918 American silent drama film directed by Charles Brabin and starring Virginia Pearson, Marc McDermott, Victor Sutherland, and Ned Finley. It is based on the 1906 novel of the same name by Justus Miles Forman. The film was released by Fox Film Corporation on December 1, 1918.

Plot

Cast
Virginia Pearson as Beatrix Buchanan
Marc McDermott as Herbert Buchanan
Victor Sutherland as Harry Faring
Ned Finley as Kansas, a tramp

Preservation
The film is now considered lost.

References

External links

1918 drama films
Silent American drama films
1918 films
American silent feature films
American black-and-white films
Fox Film films
Lost American films
Films based on American novels
1918 lost films
Lost drama films
1910s American films